was a town located in Kanzaki District, Hyōgo Prefecture, Japan.

As of 2003, the town had an estimated population of 8,238 and a density of 78.38 persons per km2. The total area was 105.10 km2.

On November 7, 2005, Kanzaki, along with the town of Ōkawachi (also from Kanzaki District), was merged to create the town of Kamikawa.

Dissolved municipalities of Hyōgo Prefecture
Kamikawa, Hyōgo